Steve House may refer to:
Sir Steve House (police officer) (born 1957), British police officer
Steve House (climber) (born 1970), American climber and mountain guide